Sancti-Spíritus is a municipality in the province of Badajoz, Extremadura, Spain. According to the 2014 census, the municipality has a population of 222 inhabitants.

A great part of the town's municipal term is submerged under the La Serena Reservoir, one of the largest in Spain.

See also
La Serena

References

External links

Municipalities in the Province of Badajoz